Robert Quattrocchi is an American politician. He served as a Republican member for the 41st district of the Rhode Island House of Representatives.

In 2017, Quattrocchi won the election for the 41st district of the Rhode Island House of Representatives. He succeeded Michael Marcello. Quattrocchi assumed his office in 2017. He had a re-election for his 41st district office, in which he won on November 3, 2020.

References 

Living people
Place of birth missing (living people)
Year of birth missing (living people)
Republican Party members of the Rhode Island House of Representatives
21st-century American politicians